Wilson Hodgson Charlton, GC (9 April 1907 – 12 May 1953) was a Royal Air Force (RAF) officer who was awarded the George Cross for his bomb disposal work during the Second World War.

Bomb disposal
During September and October 1940 he dealt with over 200 unexploded devices—on average working on three live bombs per day. He worked at aerodromes and factories in and around Wiltshire and Gloucestershire.

Notice of his award appeared in the London Gazette on 21 January 1941.

Later war service
Charlton was sent as a bomb disposal trainer to Asia and was captured by the Japanese in 1942.

Sale of medals
Charlton's medals (including a 1939–1945 Star, a Pacific Star, and Long Service and Good Conduct Medal) were sold at auction on 5 December 2012. They had an estimate of £25,000 but sold for £58,000.

References

1907 births
1953 deaths
Bomb disposal personnel
British World War II prisoners of war
Royal Air Force officers
Royal Air Force personnel of World War II
Royal Air Force recipients of the George Cross
World War II prisoners of war held by Japan
Military personnel from County Durham